Neoardelio is a genus of signal flies in the family Platystomatidae endemic to southern Africa.

Species

References

Diptera of Africa
Platystomatidae
Tephritoidea genera